André Schneider may refer to:

André Schneider (politician), French legislator
André Schneider (actor), German actor
André Schneider-Laub (born 1958), German high jumper